Caissie Levy (born April 15, 1981) is a Canadian-American actress and singer, mainly known for her work in musical theatre on Broadway and in the West End. Her early Broadway credits included Penny Pingleton in Hairspray and Sheila in Hair, a role she also played in the West End. She originated the role of Molly Jensen in the West End and Broadway productions of Ghost: the Musical and played Fantine in the 2014 Broadway revival of Les Misérables. Levy also originated the role of Elsa in Frozen on Broadway.

Early life
Levy was born in Ontario to Mark Levy, a general practitioner, and Lisa Levy, an administrator at her husband's medical practice. Both her parents are Jewish. Her two elder brothers, Robi and Josh (known as "The Levy Brothers"), are film directors, writers, and producers. Levy attended Camp Ramah in Canada. She graduated from Westdale Secondary School in 1999, then attended New York's American Musical and Dramatic Academy (AMDA).

Career
A week after graduating from AMDA in 2002, Levy was cast in the role of Maureen Johnson in the U.S. national tour of Rent. Levy then played Penny Pingleton in both the Broadway (2006) and national touring companies of Hairspray, after understudying the role in the Toronto company. She also covered the role of Amber Von Tussle. 

In 2008 Levy starred as Elphaba in the Los Angeles sit-down production of Wicked, alongside Megan Hilty as Glinda. She had previously understudied the role on Broadway and briefly served as standby in Los Angeles. She next starred as Sheila in the Broadway revival of Hair in 2009 and 2010 at the Al Hirschfeld Theatre, after which she transferred to its West End revival at the Gielgud Theatre.

In 2011 Levy originated the role of Molly Jensen in Ghost: the Musical, first at Manchester Opera House and then in London's West End at the Piccadilly Theatre. In 2012 she transferred to the Broadway production at the Lunt-Fontanne Theatre. She is featured on the cast recordings for Hair and Ghost. She also sings "Please Don't Let Me Go" on the re-release of composer Scott Alan's album Keys, as well as "Dear Daddy" on composer Bobby Cronin's album Reach the Sky: Bobby Cronin Live at the Beechman and "I Am Yours" on composer Jonathan Reid Gealt's album Thirteen Stories Down.

In 2013 Levy released the EP With You,  performed two concerts at the London Hippodrome Casino, and starred as Sara in the Trip Cullman musical Murder Ballad at the off-Broadway Union Square Theatre. She played Fantine in the Broadway revival of Les Miserables at the Imperial Theatre in 2014 and 2015.

Levy originated the role of Elsa in the stage adaptation of Frozen, which opened in Denver in 2017 and moved to Broadway in February 2018. She left the production after two years on February 16, 2020.

Personal life
On October 30, 2011, after five years of dating, Levy and actor David Reiser married in an evening ceremony at the Soho Beach House in Miami. Levy gave birth to a son, Izaiah, in February 2016, and a daughter, Talulah Ruby, in March 2021.

Levy officially became a US citizen on January 21, 2021.

Work

Theatre

Television

Film

Discography

Studio albums 
 With You – self-released (2013)

Singles
"Monster (From "Frozen: The Broadway Musical" / First Listen)" (2018)
"Dangerous to Dream (From "Frozen: The Broadway Musical" / First Listen)" (2018)
"Aquarius" (2019)

Cast recording appearances 
 Hair  (The New Broadway Cast Recording) – Ghostlight Records (2009)
 Ghost The Musical (Original Cast Recording) – Ghost Rights Worldwide LLP (2011)
 With You: Ghost The Musical Stand Up to Cancer EP – Ghost Rights Worldwide LLP (2011)
 First Daughter Suite (Original Cast Recording) – Ghostlight Records (2016)
 Frozen: The Broadway Musical (Original Broadway Cast Recording) – Walt Disney Records (2018)
The Other Josh Cohen: A Musical with Songs (Studio Cast Recording) – Yellow Sound Label (2018)
 Caroline, or Change (The New Broadway Cast Recording) – Broadway Records, Roundabout (2021)

References

External links
 
 
 Official Site
 Interview with Caissie Levy January 2013

Living people
Canadian musical theatre actresses
Canadian women singers
Jewish singers
Musicians from Hamilton, Ontario
1981 births
Jewish Canadian actresses
Jewish Canadian musicians
Actresses from Hamilton, Ontario
American Musical and Dramatic Academy alumni